Ilnur Azatovich Zakarin (born 15 September 1989) is a Russian racing cyclist, who rides for UCI ProTeam .

Career

Early career and doping ban
In 2007, as a 17-year-old, he won the juniors time trial at the European Road Championships.

In July 2009, the Russian cycling federation announced that Zakarin had been banned for two years after he had tested positive for the anabolic steroid metandienone.

He came back from his ban in 2011 and in 2012 he got a contract with continental team .

Team Katusha (2015–19)
In September 2014  announced that they had signed Zakarin on an initial two-year deal from 2015.

2015 season
In April, he finished ninth overall at the Tour of the Basque Country. At the beginning of May, Zakarin took a prestigious victory; the general classification of the Tour de Romandie. He realized this feat thanks to a good performance in the mountains, finishing second in stage 4, and a very good time trial ride on the fifth and final stage, where he finished second even though he had to change his bike midway through the course due to some mechanical issues. Zakarin made his Grand Tour debut at the Giro d'Italia, where he won Stage 11 after attacking from a breakaway in heavy rain at the Autodromo Internazionale Enzo e Dino Ferrari racing circuit in Imola.

2016 season
In 2016, Zakarin won Stage 6 of Paris–Nice atop La Madone d'Utelle, ahead of Geraint Thomas and Alberto Contador. He finished the race in fourth overall. Zakarin led Katusha at the Giro d'Italia. On Stage 19, whilst placed fifth overall, he crashed heavily on the descent of the Colle dell'Agnello, suffering fractures to his left collarbone and shoulder, ending his race. Zakarin recovered from his injuries and was named in the start list for the Tour de France. Zakarin won Stage 17 of the race after bridging up to Rafał Majka and Jarlinson Pantano at the base of the day's final climb to Finhaut–Emosson, and attacking with six kilometres remaining to solo to stage victory.

2017 season

He started the season at the Volta a la Comunitat Valenciana stage race, and continued by riding the Abu Dhabi Tour in which he finished 2nd. He finished 5th at the Giro d'Italia after finishing 2nd on three individual stages. Zakarin finished in third place at the Vuelta a España; the last time a Russian stood on the podium was in 2007, when Denis Menchov won that race. Zakarin became Russian champion in the individual time trial during the season, and finished his season by representing Russia at the World Championships.

He won the 2017 award for "Athlete of the year" in Tatarstan, and received the prize at the ceremony of athletes of the year of Tatarstan on 18 December at the Volga Region State Academy of Physical Culture, Sport and Tourism of the Republic of Tatarstan.

2018 season

He began the 2018 season at the Abu Dhabi Tour. He did not have any top 10 performances until the Critérium du Dauphiné where he finished 10th. He rode the Tour de France where he suffered a crash in the first week and survived the cobblestones of stage 9 where many general classification riders had a bad day; he was outside the top 10 going into the final week. The last two high mountain stages to Saint-Lary-Soulan and Laruns were the highlight for Zakarin where he finished in 10th place on both, then placed 7th on the final individual time trial; he finished the race in ninth overall. Later in the year at the Vuelta a España he finished 20th.

CCC Team

Gazprom–RusVelo

Personal life
Zakarin is a native of Naberezhnye Chelny in the Tatarstan region of Russia, and lives in Cyprus. He is married to Viktoria, a nutritionist. The couple's first child, a daughter, Kristina, was born in 2016. His brother Aydar Zakarin is also a racing cyclist. He is a Muslim, goes to mosque during the year, and listens to Tatari music to remind him of home. He is also a book lover.

Major results

2006
 8th Time trial, UCI Juniors World Championships
2007
 1st  Time trial, UEC European Junior Road Championships
2011
 10th Overall Giro della Regione Friuli Venezia Giulia
2012
 1st Overall Grand Prix of Adygeya
1st  Points classification
1st Stages 2 & 4
 1st Grand Prix of Donetsk
 4th Overall Tour Alsace
1st Stage 5 (ITT)
 8th Duo Normand (with Alexander Rybakov)
 9th Overall Girobio
1st  Points classification
1st Stage 5
 10th Overall Grand Prix of Sochi
2013
 1st  Time trial, National Road Championships
 3rd Overall Grand Prix of Adygeya
1st Stage 1 (ITT)
 5th Duo Normand (with Alexander Rybakov)
2014
 1st  Overall Tour d'Azerbaïdjan
 1st  Overall Grand Prix of Sochi
 1st  Overall Grand Prix of Adygeya
1st Stage 1 (ITT)
 2nd Overall Tour of Slovenia
 3rd Gran Premio Bruno Beghelli
2015
 1st  Overall Tour de Romandie
 1st Stage 11 Giro d'Italia
 3rd Overall Arctic Race of Norway
 4th Overall Tour de Pologne
 9th Overall Tour of the Basque Country
 10th Overall Tour de San Luis
2016
 1st Stage 17 Tour de France
 3rd Vuelta a Murcia
 4th Overall Paris–Nice
1st Stage 6
 4th Overall Tour de Romandie
 5th Liège–Bastogne–Liège
 7th Overall Volta a Catalunya
 7th Overall Volta ao Algarve
2017
 1st  Time trial, National Road Championships
 2nd Overall Abu Dhabi Tour
 3rd Overall Vuelta a España
 5th Overall Giro d'Italia
 6th Overall Paris–Nice
2018
 7th GP Miguel Induráin
 9th Overall Tour de France
 10th Overall Critérium du Dauphiné
2019
 8th Overall Tour de Romandie
 10th Overall Giro d'Italia
1st Stage 13
 10th Overall Paris–Nice
2020
 7th Overall UAE Tour
2021
 2nd Road race, National Road Championships
 8th Overall Vuelta Asturias
 9th Overall Settimana Ciclistica Italiana

General classification results timeline

Monuments results

See also
 List of doping cases in cycling

References

External links

 

1989 births
Living people
Doping cases in cycling
Russian sportspeople in doping cases
Russian male cyclists
People from Naberezhnye Chelny
Russian Giro d'Italia stage winners
Russian Tour de France stage winners
European Games competitors for Russia
Cyclists at the 2015 European Games
Olympic cyclists of Russia
Cyclists at the 2020 Summer Olympics
Volga Tatars
Tatar sportspeople
Tatar people of Russia
Sportspeople from Tatarstan